The Greenville County Republican Party (GCRP) is the local organization governing the Republican Party in Greenville County, South Carolina.  The GCRP is South Carolina's largest county GOP organization.  The GCRP is led by an elected group of all volunteer county party officers.  The county party organization is headquartered in Greenville.  Although the GCRP is the states largest local county organization representing approximately 11% of the entire state and as such a driving force in the state party, the GCRP has become significant as of late due to several irregularities in their leadership elections and the ongoing differences with the state party organization.  This rift has spilled over and impact campaigns at all levels and symbolic of the nation debate within the Republican Party.

2021 ReOrg Fraud Investigation
As part of the bi-annual Republican Party Reorganization process, irregularities in the leadership selection process were uncovered.  A comprehensive independent committee was formed and an investigation ensued.  After the investigative report was issues, the then current leadership resigned.

New leadership was subsequently elected.

GCRP Chairman Barred from State Meetings
On December 11, 2021, Chairman Jeff Davis was the first ever county party chairman to be barred from attending the South Carolina Republican Party (SCGOP) quarterly executive committee meetings for stating publicly that another member, former SCGOP Chairman Chad Connelly, was under investigation by the South Carolina Law Enforcement Division(SLED) for embezzling funds from a state operated children's scholarship program.  Davis was ceremoniously escorted from the meeting by three police officers.  A few days later SLED confirmed a primary investigation was opened on Mr. Connelly over 21 months earlier in March 2020.

Trump Hair Logo Controversy

To further demonstrate the rift between the more establishment style of conservatism and the populist politics embraced by Trump and his supporters, the GCRP modified their party logo to include a representation of the President Trump's famous combover.  This was the first ever know incorporation of the Trump combover on an official Republican Party logo.

Greenville County Republican Party Chairmen

 Knox White
 Lisa Stephens
 Stephen Brown (1995-1997)
 Jill Kintigh 
 Warren Mowrey
 Wendy Nanny
 Ed Foulke
 Samuel Harms (2007-2009)
 Patrick Haddon (2009-2011)
 Betty Poe (2011-2013)
 Chad Groover (2013-2017)
 Nate Leupp (2017-2021)
 Jeff Davis (2021–present)

Elected Officials

U.S. Senate
Republicans hold both of the state's U.S. Senate seats.

U.S. House of Representatives (Greenville County Only)
Republicans hold six of the state's seven U.S. House of Representatives seats.  Two seats overlap Greenville County.

Statewide offices
Governor: Henry McMaster
Lieutenant Governor: Pamela Evette
Secretary of State: Mark Hammond
Attorney General: Alan Wilson
Comptroller General: Richard Eckstrom
Treasurer: Curtis Loftis
Superintendent of Education: Ellen Weaver
Commissioner of Agriculture: Hugh Weathers

SC State House & State Senate
The South Carolina Republican Party controls all statewide offices and holds large majorities in the South Carolina Senate and the South Carolina House of Representatives.

Greenville County Council
The Greenville County Council is represented by 10 Republicans and 2 Democrats.

See also
Republican National Committee
South Carolina Republican Party
South Carolina Democratic Party
List of governors of South Carolina
United States congressional delegations from South Carolina
List of United States senators from South Carolina
List of United States representatives from South Carolina

References

External links
Greenville County Republican Party
South Carolina Republican Party
South Carolina College Republicans
Republican Party of South Carolina Records at the University of South Carolina's South Carolina Political Collections

Greenville County, South Carolina
Political parties in South Carolina
Republican Party (United States) organizations